The UCC Students' Union is a students' union in University College Cork (UCC), in Cork, Ireland. It was established in 1973 following the charter, statutes and regulations of the governing body of the college as a representative body for UCC students. Each UCC student is automatically a member by virtue of a student levy.

The main functions of the UCC Students' Union (UCCSU) are to provide academic assistance to students, to provide support to students in need, to lobby the university and the government on issues affecting students, and to provide entertainment on campus. The Student Council of the UCCSU also acts as the student parliament for UCC, and represents students on a number of committees including UCC's Governing Authority, Academic Council, and externally at national bodies such as the Union of Students in Ireland.

History
The UCC Students' Union was established in 1973 to "represent and support their members at every level within the university". The union replaced a previous body known as the 'Students' Representative Council'. This body (known in Irish as Comhairle Teachta na Mac Léinn CTM) was established around 1908. In its early years, all officers of the body served in a voluntary capacity. The first full-time officer came with the introduction of a paid presidency role in 1940, and increased to four full-time officers in 2004.

Since 2010, UCCSU has awarded Honorary Life Memberships, to "individuals that have demonstrated commitment to working in the best interests of students both within the University and externally".

On 5 December 2014, UCC Students' Union became the first third-level institution on the island of Ireland to install a permanent Pride flag on campus.

Publications
Publications by the UCCSU include union handbooks, the twice weekly union newspaper, and monthly magazine. Since 2004 the campus newspaper has been known as the 'UCC Express'. The newspaper had been known over previous years variously as: 'Aire', 'The Gazette', 'The University Examiner', 'The Campus Chronicle', and 'The University Xpress'. The union also publishes the monthly 'Motley Magazine', which was named 'KBC Irish Student Magazine of the Year' in 2014, 2015 and 2016.

Organisation
The Students Union executive is elected by the student body.

As of 2022, there are six full-time sabbatical officers, including the roles of President, Communications and Engagement Officer, Education Officer, Welfare Officer, Commercial and Fundraising Officer, and Entertainments Officer.

There are also a number of non-sabbatical/voluntary positions which are divided into three types- 
College Representatives, Campaign Representatives and Special Representatives. College Representatives represent the four colleges within University College Cork. The Campaign Representatives are made up of: Environmental & Sustainability Representative, Equality & Diversity Representative and Irish Language & Cultural Representative. Special Representatives include both voluntary representatives advocating for a specific academic group, and those who are sabbatical officers in student organisations under the university departments but sit on the SU Executive to represent those interest groups.

UCC Societies Executive and UCC Clubs Executive also have a Students' Union officer sitting on their executives.

Services
Services provided to students by UCCSU include a jobs portal, education advice and grinds, welfare advice, free condoms, and a second-hand bookshop. It is also involved in charity and fundraising, advocacy and community relations, and campaigning on other issues.

References

External links

Students' unions in Ireland
Students Union
1973 establishments in Ireland